Suevia (minor planet designation: 417 Suevia) is a typical Main belt asteroid. It is classified as a K-type/S-type asteroid.

It was discovered by Max Wolf on 6 May 1896 in Heidelberg.

References

External links
 
 

Background asteroids
Suevia
Suevia
X-type asteroids (Tholen)
Xk-type asteroids (SMASS)
18960506